Virtual Desktop Extender is a proven technology to extend a remote desktop with local applications. The technology merges local applications seamlessly into a remote desktop, hosted with Citrix XenApp, Citrix XenDesktop, Microsoft Remote Desktop Services, VMware View.

The local applications are merged in the remote desktop, and remote taskbar.

Virtual Desktop Extender technology will automatically populate the local applications into the remote start menu. The end user can simply select an application and the Virtual Desktop Extender technology will launch the local application and present the local application seamless in the remote desktop.

The local applications are running locally and use local resources.

Virtual Desktop Extender (VDX) technology is also referred to as 'subscribed applications', and 'reverse seamless windows'.

History 

Virtual Desktop Extender technology was introduced by RES Software under the name 'RES Subscriber'. Citrix has started an initiative called 'Project Alice' to demonstrate reverse seamless windows with Citrix XenApp.

References 

 Virtual Desktop Extender by analyst Simon Bramfitt
 Project Alice by analyst Brian Madden

Remote desktop